Transferrins are glycoproteins found in vertebrates which bind to and consequently mediate the transport of iron (Fe) through blood plasma. They are produced in the liver and contain binding sites for two Fe3+ ions. Human transferrin is encoded by the TF gene and produced as a 76 kDa glycoprotein.

Transferrin glycoproteins bind iron tightly, but reversibly. Although iron bound to transferrin is less than 0.1% (4 mg) of total body iron, it forms the most vital iron pool with the highest rate of turnover (25 mg/24 h). Transferrin has a molecular weight of around 80 kDa and contains two specific high-affinity Fe(III) binding sites. The affinity of transferrin for Fe(III) is extremely high (association constant is 1020 M−1 at pH 7.4) but decreases progressively with decreasing pH below neutrality. Transferrins are not limited to only binding to iron but also to different metal ions. These glycoproteins are located in various bodily fluids of vertebrates. Some invertebrates have proteins that act like transferrin found in the hemolymph.

When not bound to iron, transferrin is known as "apotransferrin" (see also apoprotein).

Occurrence and function 

Transferrins are glycoproteins that are often found in biological fluids of vertebrates. When a transferrin protein loaded with iron encounters a transferrin receptor on the surface of a cell, e.g., erythroid precursors in the bone marrow, it binds to it and is transported into the cell in a vesicle by receptor-mediated endocytosis. The pH of the vesicle is reduced by hydrogen ion pumps ( ATPases) to about 5.5, causing transferrin to release its iron ions. Iron release rate is dependent on several factors including pH levels, interactions between lobes, temperature, salt, and chelator. The receptor with its ligand bound transferrin is then transported through the endocytic cycle back to the cell surface, ready for another round of iron uptake.
Each transferrin molecule has the ability to carry two iron ions in the ferric form.

Humans and other mammals 
The liver is the main site of transferrin synthesis but other tissues and organs, including the brain, also produce transferrin. A major source of transferrin secretion in the brain is the choroid plexus in the ventricular system. The main role of transferrin is to deliver iron from absorption centers in the duodenum and white blood cell macrophages to all tissues. Transferrin plays a key role in areas where erythropoiesis and active cell division occur. The receptor helps maintain iron homeostasis in the cells by controlling iron concentrations.

The gene coding for transferrin in humans is located in chromosome band 3q21.

Medical professionals may check serum transferrin level in iron deficiency and in iron overload disorders such as hemochromatosis.

Other species 
Drosophila melanogaster has three transferrin genes and is highly divergent from all other model clades, Ciona intestinalis one, Danio rerio has three highly divergent from each other, as do Takifugu rubripes and Xenopus tropicalis and Gallus gallus, while Monodelphis domestica has two divergent orthologs, and Mus musculus has two relatively close and one more distant ortholog. Relatedness and orthology/paralogy data are also available for Dictyostelium discoideum, Arabidopsis thaliana, and Pseudomonas aeruginosa.

Structure 

In humans, transferrin consists of a polypeptide chain containing 679 amino acids and two carbohydrate chains. The protein is composed of alpha helices and beta sheets that form two domains. The N- and C- terminal sequences are represented by globular lobes and between the two lobes is an iron-binding site.

The amino acids which bind the iron ion to the transferrin are identical for both lobes; two tyrosines, one histidine, and one aspartic acid. For the iron ion to bind, an anion is required, preferably carbonate.

Transferrin also has a transferrin iron-bound receptor; it is a disulfide-linked homodimer. In humans, each monomer consists of 760 amino acids. It enables ligand bonding to the transferrin, as each monomer can bind to one or two atoms of iron. Each monomer consists of three domains: the protease, the helical, and the apical domains. The shape of a transferrin receptor resembles a butterfly based on the intersection of three clearly shaped domains. Two main transferrin receptors found in humans denoted as transferrin receptor 1 (TfR1) and transferrin receptor 2 (TfR2). Although both are similar in structure, TfR1 can only bind specifically to human TF where TfR2 also has the capability to interact with bovine TF.

Immune system 

Transferrin is also associated with the innate immune system. It is found in the mucosa and binds iron, thus creating an environment low in free iron that impedes bacterial survival in a process called iron withholding. The level of transferrin decreases in inflammation.

Role in disease

An increased plasma transferrin level is often seen in patients with iron deficiency anemia, during pregnancy, and with the use of oral contraceptives, reflecting an increase in transferrin protein expression. When plasma transferrin levels rise, there is a reciprocal decrease in percent transferrin iron saturation, and a corresponding increase in total iron binding capacity in iron deficient states 

A decreased plasma transferrin level can occur in iron overload diseases and protein malnutrition. An absence of transferrin results from a rare genetic disorder known as atransferrinemia, a condition characterized by anemia and hemosiderosis in the heart and liver that leads to heart failure and many other complications.

Studies reveal that a transferrin saturation (serum iron concentration ÷ total iron binding capacity) over 60 percent in men and over 50 percent in women identified the presence of an abnormality in iron metabolism (Hereditary hemochromatosis, heterozygotes and homozygotes) with approximately 95 percent accuracy. This finding helps in the early diagnosis of Hereditary hemochromatosis, especially while serum ferritin still remains low. The retained iron in Hereditary hemochromatosis is primarily deposited in parenchymal cells, with reticuloendothelial cell accumulation occurring very late in the disease. This is in contrast to transfusional iron overload in which iron deposition occurs first in the reticuloendothelial cells and then in parenchymal cells. This explains why ferritin levels remain relative low in Hereditary hemochromatosis, while transferrin saturation is high.

Transferrin and its receptor have been shown to diminish tumour cells when the receptor is used to attract antibodies.

Transferrin and nanomedicine 
Many drugs are hindered when providing treatment when crossing the blood-brain barrier yielding poor uptake into areas of the brain. Transferrin glycoproteins are able to bypass the blood-brain barrier via receptor-mediated transport for specific transferrin receptors found in the brain capillary endothelial cells. Due to this functionality, it is theorized that nanoparticles acting as drug carriers bound to transferrin glycoproteins can penetrate the blood-brain barrier allowing these substances to reach the diseased cells in the brain. Advances with transferrin conjugated nanoparticles can lead to non-invasive drug distribution in the brain with potential therapeutic consequences of central nervous system (CNS) targeted diseases (e.g. Alzheimer's or Parkinson's disease).

Other effects 

Carbohydrate deficient transferrin increases in the blood with heavy ethanol consumption and can be monitored through laboratory testing.

Transferrin is an acute phase protein and is seen to decrease in inflammation, cancers, and certain diseases (in contrast to other acute phase proteins, e.g., C-reactive protein, which increase in case of acute inflammation).

Pathology 

Atransferrinemia is associated with a deficiency in transferrin.

In nephrotic syndrome, urinary loss of transferrin, along with other serum proteins such as thyroxine-binding globulin, gammaglobulin, and anti-thrombin III, can manifest as iron-resistant microcytic anemia.

Reference ranges 
An example reference range for transferrin is 204–360 mg/dL. Laboratory test results should always be interpreted using the reference range provided by the laboratory that performed the test.

A high transferrin level may indicate an iron deficiency anemia. Levels of serum iron and total iron binding capacity (TIBC) are used in conjunction with transferrin to specify any abnormality. See interpretation of TIBC. Low transferrin likely indicates malnutrition.

Interactions 

Transferrin has been shown to interact with insulin-like growth factor 2 and IGFBP3. Transcriptional regulation of transferrin is upregulated by retinoic acid.

Related proteins
Members of the family include blood serotransferrin (or siderophilin, usually simply called transferrin); lactotransferrin (lactoferrin); milk transferrin; egg white ovotransferrin (conalbumin); and membrane-associated melanotransferrin.

See also 
 Beta-2 transferrin
 Transferrin receptor
 Total iron-binding capacity
 Transferrin saturation
 Ferritin
 Optiferrin recombinant human transferrin
 Atransferrinemia
 Hypotransferrinemia
 HFE H63D gene mutation

References

Further reading

External links 
 
 

Chemical pathology
Iron metabolism
Transferrins